Together Live is a live album featuring 2nd Chapter of Acts and Michael and Stormie Omartian, released in 1983. It was recorded at The Church On The Way in Van Nuys, California. As with all 2nd Chapter of Acts recordings, it was produced and engineered by Buck Herring.

Track listing
From Discogs.
 Rejoice – 3:43
 I Fall In Love/Change            – 5:21
 Lightning Flash                  – 3:00
 Bread of Life                    – 3:11
 Come Holy Spirit                 – 5:36
 Easter Song                      – 0:58
 Here I Go                        – 3:39
 Til The Walls Fall Down          – 4:19
 Nobody Can Take My Life Away     – 4:00
 Mainstream*                      – 5:28
 See This House*                  – 3:15
 Believing For The Best In You*   – 6:13
 Dr. Jesus*                       – 6:33
 Praise His Name And See It Happen* – 4:39
 Which Way The Wind Blows          – 4:30
 Killing Thousands                 – 4:19
 Mansion Builder                   – 6:20
 Haven't You Heard                 – 5:17

All songs marked (*) are performed by Michael & Stormie Omartian.  The remainder are performed by 2nd Chapter of Acts.

Personnel
The recording also features the members of a band called David, though they are not credited by their collective name.

 2nd Chapter of Acts band
 Bass: Herb Melton
 Guitar: Peter York
 Drums: Jack Kelly
 Synthesizers: Greg Springer
 Piano: Annie Herring
 Michael & Stormie Omartian band
 Piano: Michael Omartian
 Background voices: 2nd Chapter of Acts

References

Live Christian music albums
1983 live albums
Collaborative albums